Sven-Bertil Johansson (born 1 October 1956) is a Swedish sailor. He competed in the Tornado event at the 1976 Summer Olympics.

References

External links
 

1956 births
Living people
Swedish male sailors (sport)
Olympic sailors of Sweden
Sailors at the 1976 Summer Olympics – Tornado
Sportspeople from Gothenburg